Sékou Fadiga is an Ivorian footballer.

References

1988 births
Living people
Ivorian footballers
Expatriate footballers in Kuwait
AS Denguélé players
People from Lagunes District
Al Salmiya SC players
Association football midfielders
Kuwait Premier League players
Ivorian expatriate footballers
Al-Ahli SC (Tripoli) players
USM Annaba players
Ivorian expatriate sportspeople in Libya
Expatriate footballers in Libya
Libyan Premier League players